GreenSky, Inc. is a financial technology company founded in 2006 based in Atlanta, Georgia. The company provides technology to banks and merchants to make loans to consumers for home improvement, solar, healthcare and other purposes. Financing for GreenSky credit programs is provided by federally-insured, federal and state-chartered financial institutions. From 2012 to 2016 nearly $5 billion had been lent through GreenSky credit program. In September 2021, Goldman Sachs announced to acquire GreenSky for about $2.24 billion and completed the acquisition in March 2022.

Business
GreenSky is less well known than other companies in the so-called fintech market such as SoFi. or LendingClub, in part because it does not make loans using its own capital. GreenSky's partner banks—in 2016, they numbered 14 and included Regions Financial Corp. and SunTrust Banks—made loans online or through the GreenSky mobile app to customers of some 12,000 merchants ranging from retailers such as The Home Depot, Inc. to individual contractors. GreenSky signs up merchants who sell items, such as furniture and home improvement products, including window replacement, aluminum siding, and roofing. It also expanded to handle elective medical procedures.

The firm—and others like Affirm Inc., Klarna Inc. and Promise Financial Inc. -- essentially supplant credit cards for larger and more focused spending on consumer projects and then effect a fixed-period and fixed-interest-rate payback. Other competitors in the general market are Avant Inc. and On Deck Capital Inc; in solar, Mosaic Inc. and Spruce Finance Inc., backed by Kleiner Perkins Caufield & Byers. Describing GreenSky's whole business, CEO David Zalik said “We’re not competing with banks, and we’re not attempting to be a lender. We’re a technology company.” Its lending program is SSAE 16 Type II compliant.

In 2015, GreenSky was considering an expanded business presence, including a call center, in Kentucky in the greater Cincinnati area. Investment of about $7 million was being considered with a $2 million 10-year tax incentive program in discussion.  In 2015, it also announced a multimillion-dollar expansion that would create 350 jobs in Atlanta, about one-third of which would be technology related.

In 2016, the firm was profitable according to its CEO.

In 2016, CEO David Zalik was presented with the National EY Entrepreneur of the Year Award in Financial Services.

In June 2020, GreenSky, Inc. reported the closing of an Incremental Term Loan B facility of $75 million, the proceeds of which would be used for general business purposes and to strengthen the overall liquidity structure of the company.

Capitalization and valuation
The firm was founded in 2006. In September, 2016, GreenSky raised $50 million in capital and established a $2 billion lending plan with Fifth Third Bancorp in Cincinnati, Ohio. The capital valued the firm at $3.6 billion, more than twice its valuation at the last fund-raising round for  $300 million in 2014. Other investors from earlier rounds include TPG, Wellington Management, DST Global, ICONIQ Capital and QED Investors. The 2016 valuation "makes GreenSky one of the most valuable privately held financial technology startups" according to the Wall Street Journal.

On May 14, 2018, GreenSky set its IPO terms to 34.09 million shares at $21-$23.  At 38 million sold shares, the IPO exceeded Greensky's target and raised $874 million for the company.

On September 15, 2021, it was announced that Goldman Sachs would buy the company in an all-stock deal that values Greensky at $2.24 billion.  Reuters reported that the company's IPO in 2018 valued the company at about $4 billion.  CNBC reported somebody bought several tens of thousands of call options the day before the takeover was announced for 5 cents an option, and that the $4,000 investment was now worth $2 million.  CNBC also pointed out that normal daily option volume was less than 200 option contracts and their option analyst, Pete Najerian, said that "It doesn't smell right" and speculated that the trade would attract attention for possible insider trading. 

In December 2021, Puneet Dikshit, a McKinsey partner, pled guilty to insider trading.  Dikshit advised Goldman Sachs regarding its acquisition of GreenSky and used that confidential information to trade call options.

In September 2021, Goldman Sachs announced to acquire GreenSky for about $2.24 billion and completed the acquisition in March 2022.

Management and employment
David Zalik, Chief Executive Officer since 2006 and co-founder
Gerry Benjamin, Vice Chairman
Tim Kaliban, President & Chief Risk Officer

GreenSky has more than 1000 employees.

References

External links
 

Companies formerly listed on the Nasdaq
American companies established in 2006
Financial technology companies
Financial markets
Companies based in Atlanta
Financial services companies of the United States
Financial services companies established in 2006
2018 initial public offerings
2006 establishments in Georgia (U.S. state)
2022 mergers and acquisitions
Goldman Sachs
American corporate subsidiaries